The Social Centre Party is a political party in Morocco.

History and profile
The party was founded in 1984. The founder was Laheen Madih.

During the parliamentary election, held on 7 September 2007, the party did not win any seats.

References

1984 establishments in Morocco
Political parties established in 1984
Political parties in Morocco